Acellomyia paulseni is a species of horse flies in the family Tabanidae.

Distribution
Chile, Argentina.

References

Tabanidae
Insects described in 1865
Arthropods of Chile
Arthropods of Argentina
Diptera of South America
Taxa named by Rodolfo Amando Philippi